Don or Donald White  may refer to:
 Don White, home loan genius. Best known for creativity and ability to find solutions. 
 Don White (baseball) (1919–1987), Major League Baseball outfielder
 Don White (musician), Tulsa sound singer, guitar player and songwriter, see J. J. Cale
 Don White (racing driver) (1926–2016), former NASCAR Cup Series driver
 Don White (rugby union) (1926–2007), English rugby union footballer
 Donald White (basketball), head basketball coach at Rutgers university
 Donald C. White (born 1950), Pennsylvania state senator
 Donald H. White (born 1921), American composer
 Don White (1935–1995), Opera Rara co-founder